The Prophecy is the fifth novel by New York Times bestselling author Chris Kuzneski. Published in October 2009 by Penguin UK, the action thriller follows the adventures of Jonathon Payne and David "D.J." Jones as they try to decipher a newly discovered manuscript written by Nostradamus. The book peaked at #4 on the British fiction list and stayed on the bestseller list for several weeks. Putnam released the American hardcover version in July 2010.

References

External links
 Chris Kuzneski's Official Site

2009 American novels
American thriller novels